Oxythrips is a genus of insects belonging to the family Thripidae.

The species of this genus are found in Europe, Central Asia and Northern America.

Species:
 Oxythrips ajugae Uzel, 1895 
 Oxythrips altaicus Pelikan, 1990

References

Thripidae
Thrips genera